The Anglican Diocese of Maiduguri is one of ten within the Anglican Province of Jos, itself one of 14 provinces within the Church of Nigeria. Its first bishop Emmanuel Kana Mani became Archbishop of the Province while the current bishop is Emmanuel Morris.

Notes

Church of Nigeria dioceses
Dioceses of the Province of Jos